Carbinoxamine/pseudoephedrine is an antihistamine and decongestant combination, marketed as Rondec, Ceron and Coldec.  It contains two active ingredients: carbinoxamine and pseudoephedrine.

References
 https://www.drugs.com/cdi/rondec.html

Decongestants
H1 receptor antagonists
Combination drugs